Gualberto José Antonio Rodríguez Larreta Ferreira (14 December 1922 – 19 August 2015), better known as Antonio Larreta or Taco Larreta, was a Uruguayan writer, critic and actor. Born in Montevideo, he was active in Uruguay and Spain.

Selected works
 1976-1979: screenplay of Curro Jiménez (TVE1)
 1980, Volavérunt (Planeta)
 1986, Juan Palmieri Librosur)
 1988, The last portrait of the Duchess of Alba (Adler & Adler)
 1988, Las maravillosas (Ediciones Trilce)
 1999, A todo trapo. A propósito de Villanueva Saravia (Ediciones de la Plaza)
 2002, El Guante (Planeta)
 2002, El jardín de invierno 
 2004, Ningún Max (Planeta)
 2005, El sombrero chino (Editorial Fin de Siglo)
 2007, Hola, che (Editorial Fin de Siglo)

Awards
 1961: Premio Larra in Madrid for staging Lope de Vega's Porfiar hasta Morir
 1971: Premio Casa de las Américas for his play Juan Palmieri
 1980: Premio Planeta de Novela for his novel Volavérunt.
 1992: Goya Award for Best Adapted Screenplay for The Fencing Master.

References

External links
 

1922 births
2015 deaths
20th-century translators
Goya Award winners
Male dramatists and playwrights
Male novelists
Members of the Uruguayan Academy of Language
People from Montevideo
Translators to Spanish
Uruguayan dramatists and playwrights
Uruguayan male stage actors
Uruguayan novelists
Uruguayan theatre critics
Uruguayan translators
20th-century Uruguayan male writers
Uruguayan expatriates in Spain
Premio Bartolomé Hidalgo